The grey-bellied tesia (Tesia cyaniventer) is a species of warbler in the family Cettiidae.

It is found in Bangladesh, Bhutan, Cambodia, China, India, Laos, Myanmar, Nepal, Thailand, and Vietnam. Its natural habitat is subtropical or tropical moist montane forest.

References

grey-bellied tesia
Birds of Nepal
Birds of Bhutan
Birds of Northeast India
Birds of China
Birds of Yunnan
Birds of Southeast Asia
grey-bellied tesia
Taxonomy articles created by Polbot